Samuel Nicholas Wechsler (born September 3, 1978) is an American actor. He is known for his roles as Kyle Valenti on The WB teen drama series Roswell, and as Jack Porter on the ABC drama television series Revenge.

Early life
Wechsler was born in Albuquerque, New Mexico. When he was 14, his older brother, aged 24, died of cancer. He moved to Hollywood after graduating from high school.

Career 
Soon after relocating to Los Angeles, Wechsler landed a small role as a purse-stealing punk in the television movie Full Circle. Shortly after, he was cast as Kevin "Trek" Sanders, a child prodigy conceived at a Star Trek convention, in the syndicated series Team Knight Rider. He also appeared in Silk Stalkings, The Lazarus Man, and the direct-to-video film The Perfect Game.

From 1999 to 2002, Wechsler starred as Kyle Valenti on the television series Roswell. After Roswell, he guest starred in number of television series, including Malcolm in the Middle, North Shore, Cold Case, Crossing Jordan, Terminator: The Sarah Connor Chronicles, Lie to Me, It's Always Sunny in Philadelphia and Chase. In 2008, he appeared in the independent film Lie to Me, about a couple navigating the hazards of an open relationship. From 2007 to 2008, he appeared in three episodes of Without a Trace.

In 2011, Wechsler won the main role of Jack Porter on the ABC series Revenge, playing the love interest of lead character Emily Thorne. After Revenge ended in 2015, Wechsler took a role on the NBC action series The Player. In 2016, he was cast in a recurring role in the fourth season of the NBC cop drama Chicago P.D. He took on a recurring role as Brandon Cole on NBC's Shades of Blue for the show's third season. Wechsler portrayed the recurring role of Matthew Blaisdel on The CW reboot series Dynasty from 2017 to 2018. In 2019, he was cast as Ryan Sharp on NBC's This Is Us.

Filmography

Film

Television

References

External links

1978 births
Living people
20th-century American male actors
21st-century American male actors
Male actors from Albuquerque, New Mexico
American male soap opera actors
American male television actors